Therese Persson  (born 23 September 1991) is a Swedish football midfielder who currently plays for Djurgårdens IF.

External links 
 

1991 births
Living people
Swedish women's footballers
Hammarby Fotboll (women) players
Djurgårdens IF Fotboll (women) players
Damallsvenskan players
Women's association football midfielders